This is a list of butterflies of Ivory Coast. About 872 species are known from Ivory Coast, 11 of which are endemic.

Papilionidae

Papilioninae

Papilionini
Papilio antimachus Drury, 1782
Papilio zalmoxis Hewitson, 1864
Papilio nireus Linnaeus, 1758
Papilio chrapkowskoides nurettini Koçak, 1983
Papilio sosia Rothschild & Jordan, 1903
Papilio cynorta Fabricius, 1793
Papilio dardanus Brown, 1776
Papilio phorcas Cramer, 1775
Papilio zenobia Fabricius, 1775
Papilio cyproeofila Butler, 1868
Papilio demodocus s Esper, [1798]
Papilio horribilis Butler, 1874
Papilio menestheus Drury, 1773

Leptocercini
Graphium antheus (Cramer, 1779)
Graphium policenes (Cramer, 1775)
Graphium liponesco (Suffert, 1904)
Graphium illyris (Hewitson, 1873)
Graphium angolanus baronis (Ungemach, 1932)
Graphium leonidas (Fabricius, 1793)
Graphium tynderaeus (Fabricius, 1793)
Graphium latreillianus (Godart, 1819)
Graphium adamastor (Boisduval, 1836)
Graphium agamedes (Westwood, 1842)
Graphium rileyi Berger, 1950

Pieridae

Pseudopontiinae
Pseudopontia paradoxa (Felder & Felder, 1869)

Coliadinae
Eurema brigitta (Stoll, [1780])
Eurema desjardinsii marshalli (Butler, 1898)
Eurema regularis (Butler, 1876)
Eurema floricola leonis (Butler, 1886)
Eurema hapale (Mabille, 1882)
Eurema hecabe solifera (Butler, 1875)
Eurema senegalensis (Boisduval, 1836)
Catopsilia florella (Fabricius, 1775)

Pierinae
Colotis danae eupompe (Klug, 1829)
Colotis euippe (Linnaeus, 1758)
Nepheronia argia (Fabricius, 1775)
Nepheronia pharis (Boisduval, 1836)
Nepheronia thalassina (Boisduval, 1836)
Leptosia alcesta (Stoll, [1782])
Leptosia hybrida Bernardi, 1952
Leptosia marginea (Mabille, 1890)
Leptosia medusa (Cramer, 1777)
Leptosia wigginsi pseudalcesta Bernardi, 1965

Pierini
Appias epaphia (Cramer, [1779])
Appias phaola (Doubleday, 1847)
Appias sabina (Felder & Felder, [1865])
Appias sylvia (Fabricius, 1775)
Mylothris chloris (Fabricius, 1775)
Mylothris hilara (Karsch, 1892)
Mylothris jaopura Karsch, 1893
Mylothris poppea (Cramer, 1777)
Mylothris rhodope (Fabricius, 1775)
Mylothris schumanni Suffert, 1904
Mylothris dimidiata Aurivillius, 1898
Dixeia capricornus (Ward, 1871)
Dixeia cebron (Ward, 1871)
Belenois aurota (Fabricius, 1793)
Belenois calypso (Drury, 1773)
Belenois creona (Cramer, [1776])
Belenois gidica (Godart, 1819)
Belenois hedyle rhena (Doubleday, 1846)
Belenois subeida (Felder & Felder, 1865)
Belenois theora (Doubleday, 1846)

Lycaenidae

Miletinae

Liphyrini
Euliphyra hewitsoni Aurivillius, 1899
Euliphyra leucyania (Hewitson, 1874)
Aslauga lamborni Bethune-Baker, 1914
Aslauga marginalis Kirby, 1890

Miletini
Megalopalpus metaleucus Karsch, 1893
Megalopalpus zymna (Westwood, 1851)
Spalgis lemolea lemolea Druce, 1890
Spalgis lemolea pilos Druce, 1890
Lachnocnema emperamus (Snellen, 1872)
Lachnocnema vuattouxi Libert, 1996
Lachnocnema albimacula Libert, 1996
Lachnocnema disrupta Talbot, 1935

Poritiinae

Liptenini
Ptelina carnuta (Hewitson, 1873)
Pentila abraxas (Westwood, 1851)
Pentila condamini Stempffer, 1963
Pentila hewitsoni (Grose-Smith & Kirby, 1887)
Pentila pauli Staudinger, 1888
Pentila petreia Hewitson, 1874
Pentila petreoides Bethune-Baker, 1915
Pentila phidia Hewitson, 1874
Pentila picena Hewitson, 1874
Pentila preussi Staudinger, 1888
Telipna acraea (Westwood, [1851])
Telipna semirufa (Grose-Smith & Kirby, 1889)
Ornipholidotos tiassale Stempffer, 1969
Ornipholidotos sylviae Libert, 2005
Ornipholidotos onitshae Stempffer, 1962
Ornipholidotos issia Stempffer, 1969
Ornipholidotos ivoiriensis Libert, 2005
Ornipholidotos nympha Libert, 2000
Ornipholidotos carolinae Libert, 2005
Torbenia wojtusiaki Libert, 2000
Mimacraea darwinia Butler, 1872
Mimacraea neurata Holland, 1895
Mimeresia cellularis (Kirby, 1890)
Mimeresia debora catori (Bethune-Baker, 1904)
Mimeresia issia Stempffer, 1969
Mimeresia libentina (Hewitson, 1866)
Mimeresia moyambina (Bethune-Baker, 1904)
Mimeresia semirufa (Grose-Smith, 1902)
Liptena albicans Cator, 1904
Liptena alluaudi Mabille, 1890
Liptena catalina (Grose-Smith & Kirby, 1887)
Liptena evanescens (Kirby, 1887)
Liptena ferrymani bigoti Stempffer, 1964
Liptena flavicans oniens Talbot, 1935
Liptena griveaudi Stempffer, 1969
Liptena helena (Druce, 1888)
Liptena praestans (Grose-Smith, 1901)
Liptena bia Larsen & Warren-Gash, 2008
Liptena septistrigata (Bethune-Baker, 1903)
Liptena seyboui Warren-Gash & Larsen, 2003
Liptena similis (Kirby, 1890)
Liptena simplicia Möschler, 1887
Liptena submacula liberiana Stempffer, Bennett & May, 1974
Liptena submacula tringa Stempffer, Bennett & May, 1974
Liptena tiassale Stempffer, 1969
Liptena titei Stempffer, Bennett & May, 1974
Liptena xanthostola coomassiensis Hawker-Smith, 1933
Kakumia otlauga (Grose-Smith & Kirby, 1890)
Tetrarhanis baralingam (Larsen, 1998)
Tetrarhanis diversa (Bethune-Baker, 1904)
Tetrarhanis symplocus Clench, 1965
Falcuna campimus (Holland, 1890)
Falcuna leonensis Stempffer & Bennett, 1963
Larinopoda eurema (Plötz, 1880)
Micropentila adelgitha (Hewitson, 1874)
Micropentila brunnea (Kirby, 1887)
Micropentila dorothea Bethune-Baker, 1903
Micropentila mabangi Bethune-Baker, 1904
Micropentila mamfe Larsen, 1986
Pseuderesia eleaza (Hewitson, 1873)
Eresina fontainei Stempffer, 1956
Eresina fusca (Cator, 1904)
Eresina jacksoni Stempffer, 1961
Eresina maesseni Stempffer, 1956
Eresina pseudofusca Stempffer, 1961
Eresina rougeoti Stempffer, 1956
Eresina saundersi Stempffer, 1956
Eresina theodori Stempffer, 1956
Eresiomera bicolor (Grose-Smith & Kirby, 1890)
Eresiomera isca occidentalis Collins & Larsen, 1998
Eresiomera jacksoni (Stempffer, 1969)
Eresiomera petersi (Stempffer & Bennett, 1956)
Citrinophila erastus (Hewitson, 1866)
Citrinophila marginalis Kirby, 1887
Citrinophila similis (Kirby, 1887)
Argyrocheila undifera Staudinger, 1892

Epitolini
Iridana incredibilis (Staudinger, 1891)
Iridana nigeriana Stempffer, 1964
Iridana rougeoti Stempffer, 1964
Epitola posthumus (Fabricius, 1793)
Epitola urania Kirby, 1887
Epitola uranioides occidentalis Libert, 1999
Cerautola ceraunia (Hewitson, 1873)
Cerautola crowleyi (Sharpe, 1890)
Geritola albomaculata (Bethune-Baker, 1903)
Geritola gerina (Hewitson, 1878)
Geritola virginea (Bethune-Baker, 1904)
Geritola subargentea continua Libert, 1999
Stempfferia baoule Libert, 1999
Stempfferia ciconia (Grose-Smith & Kirby, 1892)
Stempfferia dorothea (Bethune-Baker, 1904)
Stempfferia kholifa (Bethune-Baker, 1904)
Stempfferia leonina (Staudinger, 1888)
Stempfferia michelae Libert, 1999
Stempfferia moyambina (Bethune-Baker, 1903)
Stempfferia staudingeri (Kirby, 1890)
Stempfferia zelza (Hewitson, 1873)
Cephetola cephena (Hewitson, 1873)
Cephetola collinsi Libert & Larsen, 1999
Cephetola maculata (Hawker-Smith, 1926)
Cephetola maesseni Libert, 1999
Cephetola mercedes ivoriensis (Jackson, 1967)
Cephetola nigra (Bethune-Baker, 1903)
Cephetola obscura (Hawker-Smith, 1933)
Cephetola pinodes (Druce, 1890)
Cephetola subcoerulea (Roche, 1954)
Cephetola sublustris (Bethune-Baker, 1904)
Neaveia lamborni Druce, 1910
Epitolina dispar (Kirby, 1887)
Epitolina melissa (Druce, 1888)
Epitolina catori Bethune-Baker, 1904
Hypophytala benitensis (Holland, 1890)
Hypophytala henleyi (Kirby, 1890)
Hypophytala hyettina (Aurivillius, 1897)
Hypophytala hyettoides (Aurivillius, 1895)
Phytala elais elais Westwood, 1851
Phytala elais catori Bethune-Baker, 1903
Aethiopana honorius divisa (Butler, 1901)
Hewitsonia boisduvalii (Hewitson, 1869)
Hewitsonia danane Stempffer, 1969
Hewitsonia inexpectata Bouyer, 1997
Hewitsonia occidentalis Bouyer, 1997

Aphnaeinae
Pseudaletis agrippina warrengashi Libert, 2007
Pseudaletis zebra subangulata Talbot, 1935
Pseudaletis leonis (Staudinger, 1888)
Pseudaletis richardi Stempffer, 1952
Lipaphnaeus aderna (Plötz, 1880)
Lipaphnaeus leonina ivoirensis Stempffer, 1966
Cigaritis iza (Hewitson, 1865)
Cigaritis menelas (Druce, 1907)
Cigaritis mozambica (Bertoloni, 1850)
Zeritis neriene Boisduval, 1836
Axiocerses harpax (Fabricius, 1775)
Axiocerses amanga borealis Aurivillius, 1905
Aphnaeus argyrocyclus Holland, 1890
Aphnaeus asterius Plötz, 1880
Aphnaeus gilloni Stempffer, 1966
Aphnaeus orcas (Drury, 1782)

Theclinae
Myrina silenus (Fabricius, 1775)
Oxylides faunus (Drury, 1773)
Dapidodigma demeter Clench, 1961
Dapidodigma hymen (Fabricius, 1775)
Hypolycaena anara Larsen, 1986
Hypolycaena antifaunus (Westwood, 1851)
Hypolycaena clenchi Larsen, 1997
Hypolycaena dubia Aurivillius, 1895
Hypolycaena hatita Hewitson, 1865
Hypolycaena kakumi Larsen, 1997
Hypolycaena lebona (Hewitson, 1865)
Hypolycaena liara Druce, 1890
Hypolycaena nigra Bethune-Baker, 1914
Hypolycaena philippus (Fabricius, 1793)
Hypolycaena scintillans Stempffer, 1957
Iolaus eurisus (Cramer, 1779)
Iolaus aethria Karsch, 1893
Iolaus alienus bicaudatus Aurivillius, 1905
Iolaus banco Stempffer, 1966
Iolaus bellina (Plötz, 1880)
Iolaus leonis (Riley, 1928)
Iolaus iasis Hewitson, 1865
Iolaus laon Hewitson, 1878
Iolaus longicauda haydoni Collins & Larsen, 2000
Iolaus maesa (Hewitson, 1862)
Iolaus pollux oberthueri (Riley, 1929)
Iolaus sappirus (Druce, 1902)
Iolaus scintillans Aurivillius, 1905
Iolaus menas Druce, 1890
Iolaus carolinae Collins & Larsen, 2000
Iolaus alexanderi Warren-Gash, 2003
Iolaus iulus Hewitson, 1869
Iolaus ismenias (Klug, 1834)
Iolaus alcibiades Kirby, 1871
Iolaus paneperata Druce, 1890
Iolaus lukabas Druce, 1890
Iolaus calisto (Westwood, 1851)
Iolaus laonides Aurivillius, 1898
Iolaus timon (Fabricius, 1787)
Iolaus catori Bethune-Baker, 1904
Iolaus kyabobo Larsen, 1996
Stugeta marmoreus (Butler, 1866)
Pilodeudorix virgata (Druce, 1891)
Pilodeudorix hamidou Libert, 2004
Pilodeudorix catori (Bethune-Baker, 1903)
Pilodeudorix leonina (Bethune-Baker, 1904)
Pilodeudorix mera (Hewitson, 1873)
Pilodeudorix otraeda (Hewitson, 1863)
Pilodeudorix caerulea (Druce, 1890)
Pilodeudorix camerona (Plötz, 1880)
Pilodeudorix diyllus (Hewitson, 1878)
Pilodeudorix zela (Hewitson, 1869)
Pilodeudorix aucta (Karsch, 1895)
Pilodeudorix aurivilliusi (Stempffer, 1954)
Pilodeudorix corruscans kakumi (Larsen, 1994)
Pilodeudorix kiellandi (Congdon & Collins, 1998)
Pilodeudorix laticlavia (Clench, 1965)
Pilodeudorix violetta (Aurivillius, 1897)
Paradeudorix eleala viridis (Stempffer, 1964)
Paradeudorix moyambina (Bethune-Baker, 1904)
Paradeudorix petersi (Stempffer & Bennett, 1956)
Hypomyrina mimetica Libert, 2004
Deudorix antalus (Hopffer, 1855)
Deudorix caliginosa Lathy, 1903
Deudorix dinochares Grose-Smith, 1887
Deudorix dinomenes diomedes Jackson, 1966
Deudorix galathea (Swainson, 1821)
Deudorix kayonza Stempffer, 1956
Deudorix lorisona (Hewitson, 1862)
Deudorix odana Druce, 1887

Polyommatinae

Lycaenesthini
Anthene amarah (Guérin-Méneville, 1849)
Anthene atewa Larsen & Collins, 1998
Anthene crawshayi (Butler, 1899)
Anthene definita (Butler, 1899)
Anthene helpsi Larsen, 1994
Anthene irumu (Stempffer, 1948)
Anthene juba (Fabricius, 1787)
Anthene lachares (Hewitson, 1878)
Anthene larydas (Cramer, 1780)
Anthene liodes (Hewitson, 1874)
Anthene lunulata (Trimen, 1894)
Anthene lysicles (Hewitson, 1874)
Anthene mahota (Grose-Smith, 1887)
Anthene princeps (Butler, 1876)
Anthene radiata (Bethune-Baker, 1910)
Anthene rubricinctus (Holland, 1891)
Anthene scintillula aurea (Bethune-Baker, 1910)
Anthene starki Larsen, 2005
Anthene sylvanus (Drury, 1773)
Anthene lyzanius (Hewitson, 1874)
Anthene chryseostictus (Bethune-Baker, 1910)
Anthene fulvus Stempffer, 1962
Anthene lusones fulvimacula (Mabille, 1890)
Anthene fasciatus (Aurivillius, 1895)
Anthene hades (Bethune-Baker, 1910)
Anthene inconspicua (Druce, 1910)
Anthene lamias (Hewitson, 1878)
Anthene lucretilis (Hewitson, 1874)
Anthene nigeriae (Aurivillius, 1905)
Anthene phoenicis (Karsch, 1893)
Anthene rufoplagata (Bethune-Baker, 1910)
Cupidesthes jacksoni Stempffer, 1969
Cupidesthes leonina (Bethune-Baker, 1903)
Cupidesthes lithas (Druce, 1890)
Cupidesthes mimetica (Druce, 1910)

Polyommatini
Cupidopsis cissus (Godart, [1824])
Cupidopsis jobates mauritanica Riley, 1932
Pseudonacaduba sichela (Wallengren, 1857)
Lampides boeticus (Linnaeus, 1767)
Uranothauma belcastroi Larsen, 1997
Uranothauma falkensteini (Dewitz, 1879)
Phlyaria cyara stactalla Karsch, 1895
Cacyreus audeoudi Stempffer, 1936
Cacyreus lingeus (Stoll, 1782)
Leptotes babaulti (Stempffer, 1935)
Leptotes pirithous (Linnaeus, 1767)
Tuxentius carana kontu (Karsch, 1893)
Tarucus kiki Larsen, 1976
Tarucus legrasi Stempffer, 1948
Tarucus rosacea (Austaut, 1885)
Zizeeria knysna (Trimen, 1862)
Actizera lucida (Trimen, 1883)
Zizula hylax (Fabricius, 1775)
Azanus mirza (Plötz, 1880)
Azanus moriqua (Wallengren, 1857)
Azanus isis (Drury, 1773)
Eicochrysops hippocrates (Fabricius, 1793)
Euchrysops albistriata greenwoodi d'Abrera, 1980
Euchrysops barkeri (Trimen, 1893)
Euchrysops malathana (Boisduval, 1833)
Euchrysops osiris (Hopffer, 1855)
Euchrysops reducta Hulstaert, 1924
Thermoniphas micylus (Cramer, 1780)
Oboronia guessfeldti (Dewitz, 1879)
Oboronia liberiana Stempffer, 1950
Oboronia ornata (Mabille, 1890)
Oboronia punctatus (Dewitz, 1879)
Freyeria trochylus (Freyer, [1843])
Lepidochrysops parsimon (Fabricius, 1775)
Lepidochrysops quassi (Karsh, 1895)
Lepidochrysops synchrematiza (Bethune-Baker, [1923])

Riodinidae

Nemeobiinae
Abisara tantalus (Hewitson, 1861)
Abisara gerontes (Fabricius, 1781)

Nymphalidae

Libytheinae
Libythea labdaca Westwood, 1851

Danainae

Danaini
Danaus chrysippus alcippus (Cramer, 1777)
Tirumala petiverana (Doubleday, 1847)
Amauris niavius (Linnaeus, 1758)
Amauris tartarea Mabille, 1876
Amauris damocles (Fabricius, 1793)
Amauris hecate (Butler, 1866)

Satyrinae

Elymniini
Elymniopsis bammakoo (Westwood, [1851])

Melanitini
Gnophodes betsimena parmeno Doubleday, 1849
Gnophodes chelys (Fabricius, 1793)
Melanitis ansorgei Rothschild, 1904
Melanitis leda (Linnaeus, 1758)
Melanitis libya Distant, 1882

Satyrini
Bicyclus abnormis (Dudgeon, 1909)
Bicyclus angulosa (Butler, 1868)
Bicyclus auricruda (Butler, 1868)
Bicyclus campus (Karsch, 1893)
Bicyclus dekeyseri (Condamin, 1958)
Bicyclus dorothea (Cramer, 1779)
Bicyclus ephorus Weymer, 1892
Bicyclus evadne evadne (Cramer, 1779)
Bicyclus evadne elionias (Hewitson, 1866)
Bicyclus hyperanthus (Bethune-Baker, 1908)
Bicyclus ignobilis (Butler, 1870)
Bicyclus istaris (Plötz, 1880)
Bicyclus madetes (Hewitson, 1874)
Bicyclus maesseni Condamin, 1971
Bicyclus mandanes Hewitson, 1873
Bicyclus milyas (Hewitson, 1864)
Bicyclus nobilis (Aurivillius, 1893)
Bicyclus pavonis (Butler, 1876)
Bicyclus procora (Karsch, 1893)
Bicyclus safitza (Westwood, 1850)
Bicyclus sambulos unicolor Condamin, 1971
Bicyclus martius (Fabricius, 1793)
Bicyclus sandace (Hewitson, 1877)
Bicyclus sangmelinae Condamin, 1963
Bicyclus taenias (Hewitson, 1877)
Bicyclus trilophus jacksoni Condamin, 1961
Bicyclus vulgaris (Butler, 1868)
Bicyclus xeneas occidentalis Condamin, 1965
Bicyclus zinebi (Butler, 1869)
Hallelesis halyma (Fabricius, 1793)
Heteropsis elisi (Karsch, 1893)
Heteropsis peitho (Plötz, 1880)
Ypthima antennata cornesi Kielland, 1982
Ypthima asterope (Klug, 1832)
Ypthima doleta Kirby, 1880
Ypthima impura Elwes & Edwards, 1893
Ypthima lamto Kielland, 1982
Ypthima pupillaris Butler, 1888
Ypthima vuattouxi Kielland, 1982
Ypthimomorpha itonia (Hewitson, 1865)

Charaxinae

Charaxini
Charaxes varanes vologeses (Mabille, 1876)
Charaxes fulvescens senegala van Someren, 1975
Charaxes candiope (Godart, 1824)
Charaxes protoclea Feisthamel, 1850
Charaxes boueti Feisthamel, 1850
Charaxes cynthia Butler, 1866
Charaxes lucretius Cramer, [1775]
Charaxes lactetinctus Karsch, 1892
Charaxes jasius Poulton, 1926
Charaxes epijasius Reiche, 1850
Charaxes castor (Cramer, 1775)
Charaxes brutus (Cramer, 1779)
Charaxes pollux (Cramer, 1775)
Charaxes eudoxus (Drury, 1782)
Charaxes numenes (Hewitson, 1859)
Charaxes tiridates (Cramer, 1777)
Charaxes bipunctatus Rothschild, 1894
Charaxes smaragdalis butleri Rothschild, 1900
Charaxes imperialis Butler, 1874
Charaxes ameliae doumeti Henning, 1989
Charaxes pythodoris davidi Plantrou, 1973
Charaxes hadrianus Ward, 1871
Charaxes nobilis claudei le Moult, 1933
Charaxes fournierae jolybouyeri Vingerhoedt, 1998
Charaxes zingha (Stoll, 1780)
Charaxes etesipe (Godart, 1824)
Charaxes achaemenes atlantica van Someren, 1970
Charaxes eupale (Drury, 1782)
Charaxes subornatus couilloudi Plantrou, 1976
Charaxes anticlea (Drury, 1782)
Charaxes hildebrandti gillesi Plantrou, 1973
Charaxes virilis van Someren & Jackson, 1952
Charaxes etheocles (Cramer, 1777)
Charaxes bocqueti , 1975
Charaxes viola Butler, 1866
Charaxes northcotti Rothschild, 1899
Charaxes pleione (Godart, 1824)
Charaxes paphianus falcata (Butler, 1872)
Charaxes nichetes bouchei Plantrou, 1974
Charaxes nichetes leopardinus Plantrou, 1974
Charaxes lycurgus (Fabricius, 1793)
Charaxes zelica Butler, 1869
Charaxes porthos gallayi van Someren, 1968
Charaxes doubledayi Aurivillius, 1899
Charaxes mycerina (Godart, 1824)

Euxanthini
Charaxes eurinome (Cramer, 1775)

Pallini
Palla publius Staudinger, 1892
Palla ussheri (Butler, 1870)
Palla decius (Cramer, 1777)
Palla violinitens (Crowley, 1890)

Apaturinae
Apaturopsis cleochares (Hewitson, 1873)

Nymphalinae
Kallimoides rumia (Doubleday, 1849)
Vanessula milca angustifascia Joicey & Talbot, 1928

Nymphalini
Antanartia delius (Drury, 1782)
Junonia chorimene (Guérin-Méneville, 1844)
Junonia hierta cebrene Trimen, 1870
Junonia oenone (Linnaeus, 1758)
Junonia orithya madagascariensis Guenée, 1865
Junonia sophia (Fabricius, 1793)
Junonia stygia (Aurivillius, 1894)
Junonia terea (Drury, 1773)
Junonia westermanni Westwood, 1870
Junonia cymodoce (Cramer, 1777)
Salamis cacta (Fabricius, 1793)
Protogoniomorpha anacardii (Linnaeus, 1758)
Protogoniomorpha parhassus (Drury, 1782)
Protogoniomorpha cytora (Doubleday, 1847)
Precis antilope (Feisthamel, 1850)
Precis ceryne ceruana Rothschild & Jordan, 190
Precis pelarga (Fabricius, 1775)
Precis sinuata Plötz, 1880
Hypolimnas anthedon (Doubleday, 1845)
Hypolimnas aubergeri Hecq, 1987
Hypolimnas dinarcha (Hewitson, 1865)
Hypolimnas misippus (Linnaeus, 1764)
Hypolimnas salmacis (Drury, 1773)
Catacroptera cloanthe ligata Rothschild & Jordan, 1903

Cyrestinae

Cyrestini
Cyrestis camillus (Fabricius, 1781)

Biblidinae

Biblidini
Byblia anvatara crameri Aurivillius, 1894
Mesoxantha ethosea (Drury, 1782)
Ariadne albifascia (Joicey & Talbot, 1921)
Ariadne enotrea (Cramer, 1779)
Neptidopsis ophione (Cramer, 1777)
Eurytela dryope (Cramer, [1775])
Eurytela hiarbas (Drury, 1782)

Epicaliini
Sevenia boisduvali omissa (Rothschild, 1918)
Sevenia occidentalium (Mabille, 1876)
Sevenia umbrina (Karsch, 1892)

Limenitinae

Limenitidini
Harma theobene Doubleday, 1848
Cymothoe althea (Cramer, 1776)
Cymothoe aubergeri Plantrou, 1977
Cymothoe caenis (Drury, 1773)
Cymothoe coccinata (Hewitson, 1874)
Cymothoe egesta (Cramer, 1775)
Cymothoe fumana (Westwood, 1850)
Cymothoe hartigi vanessae Warren-Gash, 2003
Cymothoe herminia gongoa Fox, 1965
Cymothoe jodutta (Westwood, 1850)
Cymothoe lurida (Butler, 1871)
Cymothoe mabillei Overlaet, 1944
Cymothoe sangaris (Godart, 1824)
Cymothoe weymeri mulatta Belcastro, 1990
Pseudoneptis bugandensis ianthe Hemming, 1964
Pseudacraea boisduvalii (Doubleday, 1845)
Pseudacraea eurytus (Linnaeus, 1758)
Pseudacraea hostilia (Drury, 1782)
Pseudacraea lucretia (Cramer, [1775])
Pseudacraea semire (Cramer, 1779)
Pseudacraea warburgi Aurivillius, 1892

Neptidini
Neptis agouale Pierre-Baltus, 1978
Neptis alta Overlaet, 1955
Neptis loma Condamin, 1971
Neptis najo Karsch, 1893
Neptis kiriakoffi Overlaet, 1955
Neptis melicerta (Drury, 1773)
Neptis metella (Doubleday, 1848)
Neptis mixophyes Holland, 1892
Neptis morosa Overlaet, 1955
Neptis nebrodes Hewitson, 1874
Neptis nemetes Hewitson, 1868
Neptis nicobule Holland, 1892
Neptis quintilla Mabille, 1890
Neptis nicoteles Hewitson, 1874
Neptis viridis Pierre-Baltus, 2007
Neptis lamtoensis Pierre-Baltus, 2007
Neptis paula Staudinger, 1896
Neptis puella Aurivillius, 1894
Neptis seeldrayersi Aurivillius, 1895
Neptis strigata Aurivillius, 1894
Neptis trigonophora melicertula Strand, 1912
Neptis troundi Pierre-Baltus, 1978
Neptis vindo Pierre-Baltus, 1978

Adoliadini
Catuna angustatum (Felder & Felder, 1867)
Catuna crithea (Drury, 1773)
Catuna niji Fox, 1965
Catuna oberthueri Karsch, 1894
Euryphura chalcis (Felder & Felder, 1860)
Euryphura togoensis Suffert, 1904
Euryphurana nobilis (Staudinger, 1891)
Hamanumida daedalus (Fabricius, 1775)
Aterica galene (Brown, 1776)
Cynandra opis (Drury, 1773)
Euriphene amicia amicia (Hewitson, 1871)
Euriphene amicia gola Fox, 1965
Euriphene ampedusa (Hewitson, 1866)
Euriphene aridatha (Hewitson, 1866)
Euriphene taigola Sáfián & Warren-Gash, 2009
Euriphene aridatha feronia (Staudinger, 1891)
Euriphene aridatha transgressa Hecq, 1994
Euriphene atossa (Hewitson, 1865)
Euriphene barombina (Aurivillius, 1894)
Euriphene batesana Bethune-Baker, 1926
Euriphene coerulea Boisduval, 1847
Euriphene ernestibaumanni (Karsch, 1895)
Euriphene gambiae vera Hecq, 2002
Euriphene grosesmithi muehlenbergi Hecq, 1995
Euriphene incerta (Aurivillius, 1912)
Euriphene leonis (Aurivillius, 1899)
Euriphene lomaensis Belcastro, 1986
Euriphene simplex (Staudinger, 1891)
Euriphene veronica (Stoll, 1780)
Euriphene doriclea (Drury, 1782)
Bebearia lucayensis Hecq, 1996
Bebearia tentyris (Hewitson, 1866)
Bebearia osyris (Schultze, 1920)
Bebearia dallastai Hecq, 1994
Bebearia carshena (Hewitson, 1871)
Bebearia absolon (Fabricius, 1793)
Bebearia zonara (Butler, 1871)
Bebearia mandinga (Felder & Felder, 1860)
Bebearia oxione (Hewitson, 1866)
Bebearia abesa (Hewitson, 1869)
Bebearia barce (Doubleday, 1847)
Bebearia mardania (Fabricius, 1793)
Bebearia cocalia (Fabricius, 1793)
Bebearia paludicola blandi Holmes, 2001
Bebearia senegalensis (Herrich-Schaeffer, 1858)
Bebearia sophus (Fabricius, 1793)
Bebearia arcadius (Fabricius, 1793)
Bebearia laetitia (Plötz, 1880)
Bebearia phantasina (Staudinger, 1891)
Bebearia demetra (Godart, 1824)
Bebearia warrengashi Hecq, 2000
Bebearia inepta Hecq, 2001
Bebearia maledicta (Strand, 1912)
Bebearia ashantina (Dudgeon, 1913)
Bebearia cutteri (Hewitson, 1865)
Euphaedra aubergeri Hecq, 1977
Euphaedra medon (Linnaeus, 1763)
Euphaedra gausape (Butler, 1866)
Euphaedra judith Weymer, 1892
Euphaedra melpomene aubergeriana Hecq, 1981
Euphaedra mariaechristinae Hecq & Joly, 2003
Euphaedra plantroui Hecq, 1981
Euphaedra xypete (Hewitson, 1865)
Euphaedra hebes Hecq, 1980
Euphaedra diffusa albocoerulea Hecq, 1976
Euphaedra crockeri umbratilis Hecq, 1987
Euphaedra eusemoides (Grose-Smith & Kirby, 1889)
Euphaedra cyparissa cyparissa (Cramer, 1775)
Euphaedra cyparissa aurantina Pyrcz & Oremans, 2013
Euphaedra cyparissa aurata Carpenter, 1895
Euphaedra cyparissa tai Hecq, 1986
Euphaedra sarcoptera sarcoptera (Butler, 1871)
Euphaedra sarcoptera styx Larsen & Warren-Gash, 2003
Euphaedra themis (Hübner, 1807)
Euphaedra laboureana eburnensis Hecq, 1979
Euphaedra modesta Hecq, 1982
Euphaedra minuta Hecq, 1982
Euphaedra laguerrei Hecq, 1979
Euphaedra janetta (Butler, 1871)
Euphaedra vetusta (Butler, 1871)
Euphaedra ceres (Fabricius, 1775)
Euphaedra inanum (Butler, 1873)
Euphaedra phaethusa (Butler, 1866)
Euphaedra delera Hecq, 1989
Euphaedra ravola (Hewitson, 1866)
Euphaedra tenebrosa Hecq, 1983
Euphaedra francina exuberans Collins & Larsen, 2005
Euphaedra eleus (Drury, 1782)
Euphaedra zampa (Westwood, 1850)
Euphaedra edwardsii (van der Hoeven, 1845)
Euphaedra perseis (Drury, 1773)
Euphaedra harpalyce (Cramer, 1777)
Euphaedra eupalus (Fabricius, 1781)
Euphaedra viridirupta Hecq, 2007
Euptera crowleyi (Kirby, 1889)
Euptera dorothea warrengashi Libert, 2002
Euptera elabontas (Hewitson, 1871)
Euptera zowa Fox, 1965
Pseudathyma falcata Jackson, 1969
Pseudathyma martini Collins, 2002
Pseudathyma plutonica sibyllina (Staudinger, 1890)

Heliconiinae

Acraeini
Acraea camaena (Drury, 1773)
Acraea endoscota Le Doux, 1928
Acraea leucographa Ribbe, 1889
Acraea neobule Doubleday, 1847
Acraea quirina (Fabricius, 1781)
Acraea zetes (Linnaeus, 1758)
Acraea abdera eginopsis Aurivillius, 1899
Acraea egina (Cramer, 1775)
Acraea caecilia (Fabricius, 1781)
Acraea pseudegina Westwood, 1852
Acraea rogersi Hewitson, 1873
Acraea alcinoe Felder & Felder, 1865
Acraea consanguinea sartina (Jordan, 1910)
Acraea epaea (Cramer, 1779)
Acraea macaria (Fabricius, 1793)
Acraea umbra (Drury, 1782)
Acraea vestalis Felder & Felder, 1865
Acraea acerata Hewitson, 1874
Acraea alciope Hewitson, 1852
Acraea pseudepaea Dudgeon, 1909
Acraea aurivillii Staudinger, 1896
Acraea bonasia (Fabricius, 1775)
Acraea circeis (Drury, 1782)
Acraea encedana Pierre, 1976
Acraea encedon (Linnaeus, 1758)
Acraea serena (Fabricius, 1775)
Acraea jodutta (Fabricius, 1793)
Acraea lycoa Godart, 1819
Acraea orestia Hewitson, 1874
Acraea peneleos Ward, 1871
Acraea polis Pierre, 1999
Acraea pharsalus Ward, 1871
Acraea vesperalis Grose-Smith, 1890
Acraea orina Hewitson, 1874
Acraea parrhasia (Fabricius, 1793)
Acraea translucida Eltringham, 1912
Acraea perenna Doubleday, 1847

Vagrantini
Lachnoptera anticlia (Hübner, 1819)
Phalanta eurytis (Doubleday, 1847)
Phalanta phalantha aethiopica (Rothschild & Jordan, 1903)

Hesperiidae

Coeliadinae
Coeliades bixana Evans, 1940
Coeliades chalybe (Westwood, 1852)
Coeliades forestan (Stoll, [1782])
Coeliades hanno (Plötz, 1879)
Coeliades libeon (Druce, 1875)
Coeliades pisistratus (Fabricius, 1793)
Pyrrhiades lucagus (Cramer, 1777)
Pyrrhochalcia iphis (Drury, 1773)

Pyrginae

Celaenorrhinini
Loxolexis hollandi (Druce, 1909)
Loxolexis holocausta (Mabille, 1891)
Katreus johnstoni (Butler, 1888)
Celaenorrhinus galenus (Fabricius, 1793)
Celaenorrhinus leona Berger, 1975
Celaenorrhinus meditrina (Hewitson, 1877)
Celaenorrhinus nimba Collins & Larsen, 2000
Celaenorrhinus ovalis Evans, 1937
Celaenorrhinus plagiatus Berger, 1976
Celaenorrhinus proxima maesseni Berger, 1976
Celaenorrhinus rutilans (Mabille, 1877)
Eretis lugens (Rogenhofer, 1891)
Eretis melania Mabille, 1891
Eretis plistonicus (Plötz, 1879)
Sarangesa bouvieri (Mabille, 1877)
Sarangesa brigida (Plötz, 1879)
Sarangesa laelius (Mabille, 1877)
Sarangesa majorella (Mabille, 1891)
Sarangesa tertullianus (Fabricius, 1793)
Sarangesa thecla (Plötz, 1879)
Aurina dina Evans, 1937

Tagiadini
Tagiades flesus (Fabricius, 1781)
Eagris decastigma Mabille, 1891
Eagris denuba (Plötz, 1879)
Eagris hereus quaterna (Mabille, 1890)
Eagris subalbida (Holland, 1893)
Eagris tetrastigma subolivescens (Holland, 1892)
Eagris tigris liberti Collins & Larsen, 2005
Calleagris lacteus dannatti (Ehrmann, 1893)
Calleagris landbecki (Druce, 1910)
Procampta rara Holland, 1892
Abantis bismarcki Karsch, 1892
Abantis elegantula (Mabille, 1890)
Abantis ja Druce, 1909
Abantis leucogaster (Mabille, 1890)

Carcharodini
Spialia diomus (Hopffer, 1855)
Spialia dromus (Plötz, 1884)
Spialia ploetzi occidentalis de Jong, 1977
Spialia spio (Linnaeus, 1764)
Gomalia elma (Trimen, 1862)

Hesperiinae

Aeromachini
Astictopterus abjecta (Snellen, 1872)
Astictopterus anomoeus (Plötz, 1879)
Prosopalpus debilis (Plötz, 1879)
Prosopalpus saga Evans, 1937
Prosopalpus styla Evans, 1937
Kedestes protensa Butler, 1901
Gorgyra aburae (Plötz, 1879)
Gorgyra afikpo Druce, 1909
Gorgyra aretina (Hewitson, 1878)
Gorgyra diversata Evans, 1937
Gorgyra heterochrus (Mabille, 1890)
Gorgyra minima Holland, 1896
Gorgyra mocquerysii Holland, 1896
Gorgyra pali Evans, 1937
Gorgyra sara Evans, 1937
Gorgyra sola Evans, 1937
Gorgyra subfacatus (Mabille, 1890)
Gyrogra subnotata (Holland, 1894)
Teniorhinus ignita (Mabille, 1877)
Teniorhinus watsoni Holland, 1892
Ceratrichia argyrosticta (Plötz, 1879)
Ceratrichia clara Evans, 1937
Ceratrichia crowleyi Riley, 1925
Ceratrichia maesseni Miller, 1971
Ceratrichia nothus (Fabricius, 1787)
Ceratrichia phocion (Fabricius, 1781)
Ceratrichia semilutea Mabille, 1891
Pardaleodes edipus (Stoll, 1781)
Pardaleodes incerta murcia (Plötz, 1883)
Pardaleodes sator (Westwood, 1852)
Pardaleodes tibullus (Fabricius, 1793)
Pardaleodes xanthopeplus Holland, 1892
Xanthodisca astrape (Holland, 1892)
Xanthodisca rega (Mabille, 1890)
Rhabdomantis galatia (Hewitson, 1868)
Rhabdomantis sosia (Mabille, 1891)
Osmodes adon (Mabille, 1890)
Osmodes adosus (Mabille, 1890)
Osmodes costatus Aurivillius, 1896
Osmodes distincta Holland, 1896
Osmodes laronia (Hewitson, 1868)
Osmodes lindseyi occidentalis Miller, 1971
Osmodes lux Holland, 1892
Osmodes omar Swinhoe, 1916
Osmodes thora (Plötz, 1884)
Parosmodes lentiginosa (Holland, 1896)
Parosmodes morantii axis Evans, 1937
Paracleros biguttulus (Mabille, 1890)
Paracleros placidus (Plötz, 1879)
Paracleros substrigata (Holland, 1893)
Osphantes ogowena (Mabille, 1891)
Acleros mackenii olaus (Plötz, 1884)
Acleros nigrapex Strand, 1913
Acleros ploetzi Mabille, 1890
Semalea arela (Mabille, 1891)
Semalea atrio (Mabille, 1891)
Semalea pulvina (Plötz, 1879)
Semalea sextilis (Plötz, 1886)
Hypoleucis sophia Evans, 1937
Hypoleucis tripunctata Mabille, 1891
Meza cybeutes volta Miller, 1971
Meza elba (Evans, 1937)
Meza indusiata (Mabille, 1891)
Meza leucophaea (Holland, 1894)
Meza mabea (Holland, 1894)
Meza mabillei (Holland, 1893)
Meza meza (Hewitson, 1877)
Paronymus budonga (Evans, 1938)
Paronymus xanthias (Mabille, 1891)
Andronymus caesar (Fabricius, 1793)
Andronymus evander (Mabille, 1890)
Andronymus helles Evans, 1937
Andronymus hero Evans, 1937
Andronymus neander (Plötz, 1884)
Zophopetes cerymica (Hewitson, 1867)
Zophopetes quaternata (Mabille, 1876)
Zophopetes ganda Evans, 1937
Zophopetes haifa Evans, 1937
Gamia buchholzi (Plötz, 1879)
Gamia shelleyi (Sharpe, 1890)
Artitropa comus (Stoll, 1782)
Mopala orma (Plötz, 1879)
Gretna balenge zowa Lindsey & Miller, 1965
Gretna carmen Evans, 1937
Gretna cylinda (Hewitson, 1876)
Gretna lacida (Hewitson, 1876)
Gretna waga (Plötz, 1886)
Pteroteinon caenira (Hewitson, 1867)
Pteroteinon capronnieri (Plötz, 1879)
Pteroteinon ceucaenira (Druce, 1910)
Pteroteinon concaenira Belcastro & Larsen, 1996
Pteroteinon iricolor (Holland, 1890)
Pteroteinon laterculus (Holland, 1890)
Pteroteinon laufella (Hewitson, 1868)
Pteroteinon pruna Evans, 1937
Leona maracanda (Hewitson, 1876)
Leona lena Evans, 1937
Leona leonora (Plötz, 1879)
Leona stoehri (Karsch, 1893)
Leona meloui (Riley, 1926)
Leona luehderi (Plötz, 1879)
Caenides soritia (Hewitson, 1876)
Caenides kangvensis Holland, 1896
Caenides xychus (Mabille, 1891)
Caenides benga (Holland, 1891)
Caenides otilia Belcastro, 1990
Caenides dacenilla Aurivillius, 1925
Caenides dacela (Hewitson, 1876)
Caenides hidaroides Aurivillius, 1896
Caenides dacena (Hewitson, 1876)
Monza alberti (Holland, 1896)
Monza cretacea (Snellen, 1872)
Melphina flavina Lindsey & Miller, 1965
Melphina malthina (Hewitson, 1876)
Melphina maximiliani Belcastro & Larsen, 2005
Melphina melphis (Holland, 1893)
Melphina noctula (Druce, 1909)
Melphina statira (Mabille, 1891)
Melphina statirides (Holland, 1896)
Melphina tarace (Mabille, 1891)
Melphina unistriga (Holland, 1893)
Fresna carlo Evans, 1937
Fresna cojo (Karsch, 1893)
Fresna maesseni Miller, 1971
Fresna netopha (Hewitson, 1878)
Fresna nyassae (Hewitson, 1878)
Platylesches batangae (Holland, 1894)
Platylesches chamaeleon (Mabille, 1891)
Platylesches galesa (Hewitson, 1877)
Platylesches iva Evans, 1937
Platylesches lamba Neave, 1910
Platylesches moritili (Wallengren, 1857)
Platylesches picanini (Holland, 1894)
Platylesches rossii Belcastro, 1986

Baorini
Pelopidas mathias (Fabricius, 1798)
Pelopidas thrax (Hübner, 1821)
Borbo binga (Evans, 1937)
Borbo borbonica (Boisduval, 1833)
Borbo fallax (Gaede, 1916)
Borbo fanta (Evans, 1937)
Borbo fatuellus (Hopffer, 1855)
Borbo gemella (Mabille, 1884)
Borbo holtzi (Plötz, 1883)
Borbo micans (Holland, 1896)
Borbo perobscura (Druce, 1912)
Parnara monasi (Trimen & Bowker, 1889)
Gegenes hottentota (Latreille, 1824)
Gegenes niso brevicornis (Plötz, 1884)

See also
Geography of Ivory Coast gives ecoregions.

References

Seitz, A. Die Gross-Schmetterlinge der Erde 13: Die Afrikanischen Tagfalter. Plates
Seitz, A. Die Gross-Schmetterlinge der Erde 13: Die Afrikanischen Tagfalter. Text 

Ivory Coast
Ivory
Ivory Coast
Ivory Coast
Butterflies